Discula is a genus of small land snails, terrestrial pulmonate gastropod mollusks in the family Geomitridae.

Shell description
The shell of these snails is shaped rather like a discus, or a lens, with a sharp edge around the periphery of the whorls.

Species
Species in the genus Discula include:
 Discula attrita
 Discula bulverii
 Discula calcigena
 Discula cheiranthicola
 Discula cockerelli
 Discula leacockiana
 Discula lyelliana
 Discula polymorpha
 Discula pulvinata
 Discula rotula
 Discula tabellata
 Discula tectiformis
 Discula testudinalis
 Discula tetrica

synonyms:
 Discula bicarinata is a synonym for Hystricella bicarinata (Sowerby, 1824)
 Discula echinulata is a synonym for Hystricella echinulata
 Discula oxytropis is a synonym for Hystricella oxytropis
 Discula turricula is a synonym for Hystricella turricula (R. T. Lowe, 1831)

Note
The name Discula is ambiguous and also refers to a genus of fungi in the family Valsaceae to which belongs the plant pathogen dogwood anthracnose Discula destructiva.

References

Further reading

External links